La naissance de la lyre (The Birth of the Lyre) is an opera (styled a conte lyrique) in one act by the French composer Albert Roussel. The libretto, by Théodore Reinach, is based on the satyr play Ichneutae by Sophocles. It was first performed at the Paris Opéra on 1 July 1925 with choreography by Bronislava Nijinska.

Roles

Synopsis
The newborn god Hermes steals his brother Apollo's cattle. The satyrs, led by Silenus, track him down and find Hermes has made a new musical instrument, the lyre, from the horns of one of the cattle. Apollo is so pleased with the lyre that he adopts it as his own and forgives his young brother.

References

Further reading
The Viking Opera Guide, ed. Amanda Holden (1993)

External links

French-language operas
1925 operas
Operas by Albert Roussel
One-act operas
Operas
Operas based on classical mythology
Operas based on works by Sophocles
Hermes
Apollo
Silenus